Ngozi Paul is a Canadian stage and screen actress, writer, director and producer. She is best known as the creator, executive producer, and actress of Global TV's comedic drama Da Kink in My Hair.

Early life 
Paul was born and raised in Toronto, Ontario, to a father from Dominica and a mother from St. Kitts and Nevis. She is the younger sister of former Green Party of Canada leader, Annamie Paul. With academic roots in Birmingham Conservatory for Classical Theatre, Ngozi began her acting career on stage at the Stratford Festival of Canada.

Career 
In 2003, Paul was listed as one of Toronto's top ten actors by Now Magazine. She is the recipient of the Tyrone Guthrie Award for her work with the Stratford Festival, and was Best Actress nominee at the International Black Film Festival for her performance in the film Banyan. She played a leading role in Charles Officer's Genie-nominated film Short Hymn, Silent War, featured at the 2004 Sundance Film Festival. More recently, Paul played a young Nelson Mandela in the Toronto production of the screenplay In the Freedom of Dreams: The Story of Nelson Mandela.

Paul's production credits include founding Ngozika Productions, which showcases film and TV projects from an Afro-Canadian perspective. In addition to being co-producer of the Tonya Williams Gospel Jubilee, Paul served as the creative director, associate producer, story editor and as a writer on the Gemini-nominated series Lord Have Mercy! (2003). Paul was a participant of Talent Lab, a four-day program for emerging filmmakers interested in mobile movie filmmaking.

Following a run of the theatre production Da Kink in My Hair, Ngozi co-created, executive produced, and starred in the television series of the same name (2007-2009).

In 2015, Paul's The Emancipation of Ms. Lovely—which she penned and in which she starred—was nominated for six Dora awards and won Outstanding New Play. This tale weaves Paul's personal stories with the story of Sarah Baartman (aka The Venus Hottentot) in a transcontinental allegory on the black woman's multitudinous identity. Lovely prompted Toronto's Now Magazine to write, “The magnetic Paul holds every moment onstage in a fierce, funny and moving performance.” She currently has a docu-series on-air entitled Care for Color and is in development of The 1st Time Project, a multi-platform documentary exploring female sexuality from inter-generational and inter-cultural perspectives.

Paul raises awareness for social issues such as domestic violence and homophobia within the West Indian community. In 2005, she was a celebrity cast member for the Toronto performance of The Vagina Monologues with proceeds helping local organizations that assist women in abusive relationships. Paul has been a global ambassador for Because I'm A Girl and the Stephen Lewis Foundation.

Works

Stage

Television

Film

References

External links 
 

Living people
Actresses from Toronto
Canadian stage actresses
Canadian television actresses
Canadian television producers
Canadian women television producers
Black Canadian actresses
Canadian people of Dominica descent
Canadian people of Saint Kitts and Nevis descent
Canadian Film Centre alumni
Year of birth missing (living people)